Acaiatuca quadricostata is a species of beetle in the family Cerambycidae. It was described by Tippmann in 1953. It is known from Brazil.

References

Hemilophini
Beetles described in 1953